AAH, Aah, Aaah, or Aaaah may refer to:

Acronyms and codes
 AAH Action Against Hunger, an international aid effort aimed at alleviating malnutrition in children
 Adopt-a-Highway, a common name for highway litter control programs
 Advanced Attack Helicopter, a 1970s US Army program to develop a new attack helicopter
 Aloha Airlines of the United States
 Aquatic ape hypothesis, the idea that human ancestors at some point lived partially in water
 Arlington Academy of Hope, a non-profit organization that helps Ugandan children reach their full potential
 Asa'ib Ahl al-Haq, an Iraqi Shi'a insurgent group
 Association of Ancient Historians, learned society and publisher for ancient history
 Association of Art Historians, learned society for art historical study in the UK
 Australian Academy of the Humanities, an institution dedicated towards advancing Australian scholarship in the humanities
 Huron High School (Ann Arbor, Michigan)
 Merzbrück Airport near Aachen, Germany
 African Americans for Humanism, a program of the Council for Secular Humanism
Atypical adenomatous hyperplasia

Other uses
 Aah (film), a 1953 Hindi film starring Raj Kapoor and Nargis
 Aaaah (film), a 2014 Tamil horror film
 Abu’ Arapesh language, a language of Papua New Guinea
 Aah (god), Egyptian god also known as Iah